Ashley Creek may refer to:

Ashley Creek (Minnesota), a stream in Minnesota
Ashley Creek (Current River tributary), a stream in Missouri
Ashley Creek, Missouri, an unincorporated community
Ashley Creek (Flathead River tributary), a stream in Montana
Ashley Creek (Utah), a stream in Utah